William Kirtley was an English professional footballer who played as a goalkeeper for Sunderland.

References

English footballers
Association football goalkeepers
Sunderland A.F.C. players
Sunderland Albion F.C. players
English Football League players